Besedka Johnson (October 5, 1925 – April 4, 2013) was an American woman notable for gaining critical praise at the age of 85 in her first and only film, Starlet (2012).

Biography
Born in Detroit in 1925 as Beatrice Vivian Divic, she moved with her family as a teenager to Southern California. 

She worked briefly as a model and married a painter whose surname was Johnson. They had three sons together: James (Jim), Marc and Lloyd, before getting divorced. She later married and divorced a second time.

In the 1960s, Johnson took the first name Besedka, after a dress shop that she owned and operated in the San Fernando Valley. Later in life she managed a condo in San Francisco for a time before returning to the Los Angeles area.

In 2011 she had knee surgery and swam at a Hollywood YMCA as part of her rehabilitation. There she was 'discovered' at the age of 85 by an executive film producer seeking an older woman for a role in a movie. 

Johnson prepared for an audition and was cast in a lead role in the independent film Starlet (2012), her only movie. In it she forms a relationship with a much younger woman, played by Dree Hemingway. Johnson garnered critical praise and multiple awards for her performance.

Johnson died in 2013. She was survived by her three sons and two grandchildren.

Early years
Johnson was born Beatrice Vivian Divic in Detroit, Michigan, on October 5, 1925, one of two children of Milan and Frances Divic. When she was around 17, she moved to Los Angeles to pursue a modeling career.

She began using the first name "Besedka" during the 1960s, which came from the name of a dress shop she owned on Ventura Boulevard in Woodland Hills, California, at the time. She took the surname "Johnson" from her first husband. She later opened another Besedka dress store on Riverside Drive in North Hollywood, which she closed in 1981.

Accolades 
Besedka won Special Jury Recognition at the South by Southwest Film Festival and the Independent Spirit Robert Altman Award for Best Ensemble Cast jointly with the rest of the cast of Starlet at the 2013 Film Independent Spirit Awards.

Death
Johnson died from complications following surgery for a bacterial infection on April 4, 2013, at Glendale Memorial Hospital in Glendale, California, at the age of 87. Twice divorced, she was survived by her three sons from her first marriage and two grandchildren.

References

External links

1925 births
2013 deaths
American film actresses
Actresses from Detroit
Businesspeople from Los Angeles
Infectious disease deaths in California
20th-century American businesspeople
20th-century American actresses
21st-century American women